Dorycera tuberculosa is a species of picture-winged fly in the genus Dorycera of the family Ulidiidae found in 
Greece.

References

tuberculosa
Insects described in 1908
Diptera of Europe
Taxa named by Friedrich Georg Hendel